Blanshard may refer to:

Places:
Blanshard, Manitoba, rural municipality in the province of Manitoba in Western Canada
Blanshard Peak, distinctive rock pinnacle in Golden Ears Provincial Park
Blanshard Street, arterial road in Victoria, British Columbia

Given name:
Blanshard Stamp QC (1905–1984), English lawyer, a Lord Justice of Appeal and a member of the Privy Council
Harry Blanshard Wood VC MM (1882–1924), English recipient of the Victoria Cross

Surname:
Brand Blanshard (1892–1987), American philosopher known primarily for his defense of reason
Paul Blanshard (1892–1980), controversial author, lawyer, Humanist, and outspoken critic of Catholicism
Richard Blanshard MA (1817–1894), English barrister, first governor of the Colony of Vancouver Island from 1849 to 1851

See also
Blanchard